Piia Pantsu (born March 29, 1971 in Varkaus, Finland) is a Finnish equestrian rider. She competes in three-day eventing and in show jumping competitions. She is married to Fredrik Jönsson who was the son of her trainer, Jan Jönsson.

She competed in the individual eventing at the 2000 Summer Olympics. She would have also been at Athens but an injury to her horse prevented it.

Horses
 Cyna (born 1983, died 2007)
 Ypäjä Karuso (born 1993)
 Ypäjä Uppercut (born 1989)
 Oazis (born 1996)
 Ypäjä Kolombia (born 1998)

Achievements & Competitions
(eventing championships)

References

External links
 Official website 

1971 births
Living people
People from Varkaus
Finnish female equestrians
Show jumping riders
Olympic equestrians of Finland
Equestrians at the 2000 Summer Olympics
Sportspeople from North Savo